The Tsushima brown frog or Tsushima leopard frog (Rana tsushimensis) is a species of frog in the family Ranidae. It is endemic to the Tsushima Island, Japan.

This species is common and occurs in forests and streams from lowland to hilly areas. Breeding takes place in rice paddies, ditches, swamps, and other wetland habitats. It is not facing any known threats, although its small range is a vulnerability.

References

Rana (genus)
Endemic amphibians of Japan
Amphibians described in 1907
Taxa named by Leonhard Stejneger
Taxonomy articles created by Polbot